Matthew Rickard (born 1993) is an former English footballer who played as a striker.

Club career
Rickard was a product of the Plymouth Argyle Centre of Excellence. He made his first-team debut as a substitute in a 2–0 defeat against Oldham Athletic on 15 January 2011.

Rickard moved to the US in 2011 and enrolled at the University of Michigan thus becoming one of the Michigan Wolverines who play in the Big Ten Conference in the NCAA Division 1. After one season at Michigan, he transferred to Oakland University and played three seasons for the Oakland Golden Grizzlies, twice qualifying for the post-season NCAA Division I Men's Soccer Championship as the Horizon League tournament champions.

After retiring from football, Rickard now works at Mercedes Benz South West in Exeter.

References

External links
Matt Rickard player profile at pafc.premiumtv.co.uk
Matthew Rickard player profile at mgoblue.com

1993 births
Living people
Sportspeople from Exeter
Footballers from Devon
English footballers
Plymouth Argyle F.C. players
English Football League players
Michigan Wolverines men's soccer players
Oakland Golden Grizzlies men's soccer players
Association football forwards